Axiat  is a commune in the Ariège department in the Occitanie region of southwestern France.

The inhabitants of the commune are known as Axiatois or Axiatoises.

Geography
Axiat is located some 27 km south-east of Foix and some 12 km north-west of Ax-les-Thermes. Access to the commune is by the D20 road from Appy in the west which passes through the south of the commune and the village before continuing south to Lordat. The commune is alpine in nature with snow-capped mountains in the north, extensive forests, and rugged terrain. There is some farming activity in the south near the village.

The Ruisseau d'Axiat forms the southern border of the commune as it flows west to join the Ariege at Urs. The Ruisseau de la Cassagne forms the south-western border of the commune as it flows south to join the Ruisseau d'Axiat. The Ruisseau de Girabel forms the north-western border of the commune as it flows south to join the Ruisseau de la Cassagne. The Ruisseau de Sauquet rises in the north of the commune and flows south through the centre near the village and joins the Ruisseau d'Axiat on the southern border. The Ruisseau de Fontronne forms the eastern border of the commune as it flows south to join the Ruisseau d'Axiat on the southern border.

There is also a hamlet called Axiat in the commune of Miglos.

Neighbouring communes and villages

Administration

List of Successive Mayors

Demography
In 2017 the commune had 41 inhabitants.

Culture and heritage

Religious heritage
The Church of Saint Julien (11th century) is registered as an historical monument.

Photos of the Church

Environmental heritage
The Soularac Peak (2,368 m)
The Saint-Barthélemy Peak (2,348 m)

See also
Communes of the Ariège department

References

External links
Axiat on the old IGN website 
Axiat on Géoportail, National Geographic Institute (IGN) website 
Axiat on the 1750 Cassini Map

Communes of Ariège (department)